"Story of a Life" is a song written and performed by Harry Chapin, from the album Sequel. The song is the final single released from the album, and Chapin's final single before his death in July 1981. When released, it became a hit on the Billboard Bubbling Under Hot 100. Peaking at 105, it stayed on the chart for five weeks making all three singles from the album hits. It has been included on numerous anthology releases.

Background
When talking about the song, Chapin says that he wrote it in a romantic mood. He explains that he came up with the song when he was flying home in a jet when there was a storm and his life flashed before his eyes.

Chart performance

Different versions
The song has an  alternate version that was previously unreleased. The alternate version was released on the Onwards and Upwards album.

Other uses
Harry's brother, Tom Chapin covered the song.
It was included on the Lies and Legends cast recording.

References

1981 songs
Harry Chapin songs
Songs written by Harry Chapin